Louie Espinoza (born May 12, 1962 in Globe, Arizona) is an American boxer in the Featherweight division. He now resides in Chandler, Arizona.

Espinoza turned pro in 1982 and won the Vacant WBA Super Bantamweight Title in 1987 by defeating Tommy Valoy, becoming the first world champion boxer from Arizona in history. He defended the title twice before losing it to Julio Gervacio later that year. In 1989 he took on IBF Featherweight Title holder Jorge Páez but came up short in a draw. He won the WBO Featherweight Title later that year by beating Maurizio Stecca by TKO, but lost the belt the following year in a close decision loss in a rematch with Páez.

External links 
 

|-

1962 births
Living people
Featherweight boxers
World featherweight boxing champions
Super-bantamweight boxers
World super-bantamweight boxing champions
World Boxing Association champions
World Boxing Organization champions
People from Globe, Arizona
Boxers from Arizona
Sportspeople from Chandler, Arizona
American male boxers
People from Winkelman, Arizona